William Swain may refer to:
William Moseley Swain (1809–1868), American journalist, publisher and founder
William Swain (architect) (b.1861), American architect and mayor in Pullman, Washington
William Swain (diplomat), ambassador from the Marshall Islands to the United Nations
William Swain (cricketer), English cricketer, businessman and inventor
Bill Swain, linebacker

See also
William Swayne, bishop
William Marshall Swayne, American sculptor and writer
William Swayne (MP), Member of Parliament in the House of Commons  for Chippenham (UK Parliament constituency)